Consolidated Freightways (CF) was an American multinational less-than-truckload (LTL) freight service and logistics company founded on April 1, 1929, in Portland, Oregon, and later relocated to Vancouver, Washington. Affectionately known as "CornFlakes", Consolidated Freightways was also the founder of the Freightliner line of heavy trucks, now owned by Daimler-Benz. At its height, the company possessed over 350 terminals, employing more than 15,000 truck drivers, dock workers, dispatchers and management. Consolidated Freightways was once the nation's number one long-haul trucking company and the 3rd largest-ever US bankruptcy filing, ceasing business in 2002.

History

Foundation and early history 

Consolidated Freightways was founded on April 1, 1929 by Leland James in Portland, Oregon. Originally a single truck LTL operation, in the early days James combined four local short-haul carriers in the Portland area into a single carrier. At the beginning, the company primarily focused on the Portland area before expanding into the region.

James was an innovator focused on improving the product capacity of his truck and trailer combinations. Length laws were stringent in the 1930s, so if a company were to survive they had to be innovative. James purchased his custom power units from Freightways Manufacturing Company and helped to design the first Cab Over Engine (COE) power units used in the US. These COE power units were lightweight and short, allowing for an additional freight box mounted on the frame of the truck behind the cab for single trailer units. Shorter COE units without the frame-mounted freight box could haul longer than normal short trailers hitched as doubles. Both of these configurations allowed each combination to haul more freight than standard configurations.

These innovations in truck and trailer design and configuration led to CF founding Freightways Manufacturing in 1939. It was later re-branded as Freightliner Manufacturing. Over the subsequent years, CF acquired additional manufacturing companies including railroad equipment manufacturer Transicold Corporation and glass fiber product manufacturer Technic-Glas Corporation.

In the late 1930s, CF began serving the Northwest US region and down the West coast into California but by the late 1940s had routes as far east as Chicago. The company went public in November 1951, opening on the New York Stock Exchange at $1.80.

Under strict regulation in the 1950s, CF grew primarily through acquiring smaller competitors, totaling 53 by the end of the decade. This was carried out under the leadership of CF president Jack Snead who took the position in 1955. Its operations covered 34 states plus Canada and included 13,800 pieces of equipment.

Restructuring and refocus 

Following a half-decade of expansion through acquisitions, most of which were not integrated with one another, the company's financials were unstable and it reported a  loss for 1960. This led to a change in leadership at CF with William White replacing Snead as president in 1960. Under White's leadership, CF underwent restructuring or sale of many of the company's subsidiaries, including a small parcel company, with the goal of restoring the company's focus and centralizing management.

These moves resulted in a turnaround in financial performance and by 1969 the company had  in revenue.

CF created specialized truckload division, CF Arrowhead, in 1980 based in Menlo Park CA. This subsidiary was a union owner-operator company with specialized trailers, such as flat beds, drop decks and heavy haul, to service their existing customers with freight that couldn't be transported in CF's van trailers.

By 1981, the company's stock was valued at $38.00/share. Also in 1981, CF won a case before the U.S. Supreme Court, Kassel v. Consolidated Freightways Corp. The court found that Iowa's length restriction on tractor-trailers violated the Dormant Commerce Clause.

CF ventured into regional trucking in 1983 with its Con-Way carriers. Consolidated Freightways' drivers and dockworkers were unionized, and the new Con-Way companies (Con-way Central Express (CCX), Con-way Western Express (CWX), Con-way Eastern Express (CEX), etc.) were nonunion, creating tense relations with CF's Teamsters. CEX was the former Penn-Yan Express, and was union, but Conway dissolved the company and later allowed CCX to assume its routes, thereby eliminating all union affiliation with the company.

On April 3, 1989, CF purchased Emery Air Freight Corp., and its subsidiary Purolator Courier Corporation. CF merged its pre-existing air freight operation, CF Air Freight, into Emery which it renamed Emery Worldwide. This division was union. However, Purolator carried significant debt meaning Emery as a whole was losing almost  a day at the time of acquisition.

As it had in the 1960's, CF again put in place new management and restructured and refocused the company in the early 1990s, this time with specific attention to the Emery division. The changes, including a complete restructure of Emery's overnight service, were successful at bringing Emery to a better financial position and by 1995 it was the most profitable company in the air freight industry.

Company split 

In 1996, Consolidated Freightways, Inc. spun off its unionized long-haul trucking business, CF MotorFreight and four other long-haul subsidiaries, from its non-union LTL operations and related businesses creating two separate publicly traded companies. The long-haul group was renamed Consolidated Freightways Corporation and the former parent company, Consolidated Freightways, Inc., was renamed CNF Transportation Inc. The name was chosen to reflect the company's long-time stock ticker symbol, CNF.

CNF retained the Con-Way regional LTL companies, Emery Worldwide, and the growing logistics business, Menlo Logistics. The spinoff long-haul trucking company, now called Consolidated Freightways Corporation, filed for Chapter 11 bankruptcy on September 3, 2002, and ceased operations.

Due to poor fleet maintenance, Emery shut down aircraft operations in 2001. Emery subsidiary Emery Worldwide Forwarding was put under Menlo Worldwide Logistics in 2002 and later renamed Menlo Worldwide Forwarding. Another Emery subsidiary which continued operating, Emery Global Logistics, was later absorbed into Menlo Logistics. Menlo Worldwide Forwarding was sold to UPS in 2004.

On April 18, 2006, CNF Transportation re-branded itself under a new name, Con-Way, and remained in operation until October 30, 2015, when they were acquired by Greenwich, Connecticut-based XPO Logistics, Inc.

Subsidiaries

Freightliner 

Freightliner Manufacturing, founded by CF as Freightways Manufacturing in 1939 was a key to CF's early success. To begin with, Freightliner only built equipment for CF but in 1951 the company contracted Ohio-based White Motor Company to market and sell the excess trucks that CF didn't need, as it expanded, creating the White/Freightliner name. CF also built their own trailers, eliminating the middleman and allowing for costs to stay low. By purchasing custom trucks from a company they owned and building their own trailers, CF was able to hold a strategic advantage over its competition.

Freightliner terminated its contracts with White in 1977 and began to build a network of direct agent and dealer relationships. However, forced by a deregulation bill passed by Congress in 1980, CF sold its truck manufacturing business and the Freightliner brand to Daimler AG on July 31, 1981.

Con-way 

Con-way was founded by CF to serve as a non-union short-haul LTL carrier subsidiary in 1983. The name came from the beginning of Consolidated and the end of Freightways. Con-way was intended to act regionally and began in May 1983 with a subsidiary, Con-way Western Express (CWX), in three western states. In June, Con-way Central Express (CCX) started operations in the Midwest. These carriers together had 230 employees and 334 pieces of equipment and on their first day of operations handled 113 shipments.

CWX and CCX were followed by Con-way Southern Express (CSE) and Con-way Eastern Express (CEX) to serve the Southern and Eastern regions of the US, respectively. All except CEX, which was formerly Penn-Yan Express, were non-union. Shortly after its formation, Con-way dissolved CEX and allowed CCX to assume its routes turning Con-way into a fully non-union organization.

When CF split in 1996, Con-way continued to be owned by CNF Transportation Inc., the parent company formerly called Consolidated Freightways, Inc. In 2006, CNF Transportation changed its name to Con-way, Inc. and its former Con-way subsidiary became Con-way Freight.

Con-way, Inc., along with Con-way Freight and its other subsidiaries, was acquired by XPO Logistics in 2015 and by May 9, 2017 the Con-way brand had been retired with XPO completing its integration the company into the XPO Logistics brand.

Menlo Logistics 

Menlo Logistics Inc. was founded by CF in October 26, 1990 to provide warehouse, inventory, and transportation management services. Its name was intended to evoke California's Menlo Park and that area's connections with high-tech industries. The subsidiary's purpose was to provide its services through custom systems and software to allow Menlo clients to fully integrate supply chains. When CF split in 1996, Menlo was retained by the parent company, renamed CNF Transportation.

Menlo founded a joint venture subsidiary, Vector SCM, along with General Motors (GM) in 2000 as a global supply chain management company focused on the automotive industry. In 2002 Menlo was renamed Menlo Worldwide Logistics when CNF merged it with Vector SCM and CNF subsidiary Emery Worldwide Forwarding, a former subsidiary of the then-defunct Emery Air Freight. Emery Worldwide Forwarding was later renamed Menlo Worldwide Forwarding. Later, Menlo Logistics absorbed another former Emery Air Freight subsidiary, Emery Global Logistics.

Menlo Logistics subsidiary Menlo Worldwide Forwarding was sold to UPS in 2004 and the same year the logistics unit of CNF's Con-Way Transportation Service, Con-way Logistics, was merged into Menlo Logistics. Two years later, GM bought out Menlo Logistics' interest in Vector SCM. In 2007, Menlo Logistics acquired Singapore-based Cougar Holdings and Shanghai-based Chic Holdings.

Menlo Logistics along with its parent company, by then renamed Con-way, Inc., was acquired by XPO in 2015. Following the acquisition, Menlo was folded into XPO and the brand was retired.

Emery Worldwide 

The predecessor of Emery Worldwide, Emery Air Freight, had been founded in 1946 and acquired Purolator Courier, Inc. in 1987. When CF bought Emery in 1989, CF merged its existing air freight subsidiary, CF Air Freight, into Emery to form Emery Worldwide. However, Purolator's debt load meant Emery was losing almost  a day at the time of acquisition. This led CF to restructure Emery, particularly its overnight service, bringing it to profitability by the mid 1990s.

When CF split in 1996, Emery was retained by the parent company, renamed CNF Transportation. But, due to poor fleet maintenance, Emery shut down aircraft operations in 2001 and in 2002 its air freight forwarding division, Emery Worldwide Forwarding which continued to operate, was put under CNF subsidiary Menlo Worldwide Logistics. It was later renamed Menlo Worldwide Forwarding and was acquired by UPS in 2004. Following Emery's shut-down, Menlo Logistics absorbed former Emery subsidiary Emery Global Logistics. UPS continued to use the name Emery Worldwide for the air freight operations of UPS subsidiary UPS Supply Chain Solutions.

See also 
 List of companies based in Oregon

References

External links 
CF tribute site (complete with pictures)

Defunct companies based in Oregon
Companies based in Portland, Oregon
Companies that filed for Chapter 11 bankruptcy in 2002
Companies disestablished in 2002
Trucking companies of the United States
1929 establishments in Oregon
2002 disestablishments in Oregon
Transportation companies based in Oregon